Lucius Porcius Cato was a Roman general and politician who became consul in 89 BC alongside Gnaeus Pompeius Strabo. He died at the Battle of Fucine Lake, possibly at the hands of Gaius Marius the Younger.

Biography
Lucius Porcius Cato was a son of Marcus Porcius Cato Salonianus. He was elected praetor in 92 BC. In 90 BC, during the Social War, he was given a propraetoral command and defeated an Etruscan army which had joined the revolt. He was elected consul in 89 BC, alongside Pompey Strabo, and took over the southern command from Lucius Caesar. Although his troops were undisciplined and mutinied at one point, he managed to inflict a defeat on them early on. However, at the Battle of Fucine Lake in the winter of 89 BC, he was winning an engagement with the Marsi when he was killed near the end of the battle, in an attempt to storm the enemy camp, leading to a Marsic victory. Although it is usually assumed that he was killed by Marsic soldiers, at least one source states that he was killed by Gaius Marius the Younger, the son of the famous Roman general and politician, Gaius Marius, who was furious that Cato had boasted that his own achievements were on par with the elder Marius's victory over the Cimbri.

Cultural depictions
The circumstances surrounding his death constitute a subplot in the second novel of the Australian novelist Colleen McCullough's Masters of Rome series, The Grass Crown.

References

Sources
 
 
 

2nd-century BC births
Year of birth uncertain
89 BC deaths
1st-century BC Roman consuls
Ancient Roman generals
Roman generals killed in action
Cato, Lucius
Roman consuls who died in office